Lake Venado is an endorheic lake located at the foot of Mount Apo in the province of North Cotabato, Mindanao, Philippines. The lake is fed by local run-off and there is no outflow from the lake. The lake usually loses two-thirds of its size during dry months due to evaporation.

The name of the lake comes from the Spanish word venado, "deer," owing to the deer-like shape of the lake. However, the people living in the area called the lake Linaw, a Cebuano word for "clear", because its crystal-clear waters reflect the peak of Mount Apo. Local tribes believe the lake to be enchanted, inhabited by spirits.

The vicinity of the lake is a popular camping site for mountaineers en route to and coming down from the peak of Mount Apo, the Philippines' highest mountain. In 2007, a Filipino mountaineer descending from the summit drowned in the lake.

References

External links
 Geographic data related to Lake Venado at OpenStreetMap

Venado
Venado
Landforms of Cotabato